The Marlands Shopping Centre (formerly known as The Mall, Southampton) was opened on 5 September 1991.  At the time, the Marlands Shopping Mall was the largest shopping centre in Southampton and the first significant shopping centre in the city (East Street Shopping Centre being well out of the way of the main shopping district hence never being very successful and the Bargate Centre being much smaller), however it is now dwarfed by Westquay, which opened in 2000.

The Marlands Shopping Centre was constructed to a postmodern design, and was built on the site of Southampton's bus station (the city is now without such a facility), a popular rose garden and some terraced housing which had become shops, on Manchester Street. These were destroyed in 1988 to make way for the shopping centre, despite local opposition. A replica of the Manchester Street shops was constructed as part of the Centre's atrium.

The centre is laid out across two levels, with escalators connecting them at the North West entrance and escalators and glass lifts connecting them in the atrium, at  the South of the centre.  Unlike most of its contemporaries, the Marlands Shopping Centre does not contain a car park of any kind - the designated car park for the centre is accessed by going through Southampton's unusual ASDA supermarket which is on a slope - you go in on the ground floor and come out on the tenth floor - and across a bridge.

The layout of the centre consists of an L-shaped mall where the street entrance at Above Bar Street leads through the centre's main arcade, to terminate at a large anchor store. The original anchor tenant of the mall was Dunnes Stores, though following their exit this facility was later occupied by Matalan. In 2014 it was confirmed that the Matalan store would be split to provide retail stores for Peacocks and Poundworld. Since then Peacocks has closed down.  Other significant stores within the centre include The Saints Store, CeX and F. Hinds.  The upper level of the centre has never been hugely successful - many of the units have been empty for some time.  This lack of success is mainly due to the centre's location which is to the Northern part of the main shopping area although still in the centre of the city.

In 2005-2006 the main (Above Bar Street) entrance to the centre was significantly refurbished.  The original 'Postmodern' sign tower was replaced with an ultramodern glass and steel canopy and a new Costa Coffee outlet.  An information desk was also added. The telephone of the management offices however stayed the same as (023) 8033 9164.

On Thursday 19 August 2010 The Mall was sold as a £136m deal. Other Malls throughout the UK have been sold and will now be run as part of a group, together with others in Gloucester, Romford and Falkirk, by a specially created management company called The Other Retail Group.

On June 9th 2021, the iconic well-known Disney Store shut its doors for the last time. The Saints Store has replaced it.

References

External links
 The Marlands
 The Other Retail Group

Buildings and structures in Southampton
Shopping centres in Hampshire